François Doumen (born 11 June 1940) is a retired French racehorse trainer. From 1956 to 1970 he was an amateur jockey, and he then worked as an assistant trainer to his father Jean. As a young man he had also been a competitive slalom skier. He obtained his own training licence in 1977 and retired in August 2017 after suffering ill health.

Doumen was initially based at Maisons-Laffitte, and he subsequently moved to Lamorlaye and later Chantilly and Boucé, Orne. Doumen was successful in both flat and jump racing, and his most notable horses included The Fellow, Jim and Tonic and Baracouda. His son, Thierry, is also a trainer and a former jockey.

Major wins
 France
 Grand Steeple-Chase de Paris - (5) - The Fellow (1991), Ucello II (1993, 1994), Ubu III (1995), First Gold (1998)
 Grande Course de Haies d'Auteuil - (3) - Ubu III (1992, 1993), Laveron (2002)
 Prix du Cadran - (1) - Kasbah Bliss (2011)
 Prix Ferdinand Dufaure - (1) - Ucello II (1990)
 Prix La Haye Jousselin - (3) - The Fellow (1990), Ucello II (1992), First Gold (2000)

 Canada
 E. P. Taylor Stakes - (1) - Siyouma (2012)

 Great Britain
 Cheltenham Gold Cup - (1) - The Fellow (1994)
 Feltham Novices' Chase - (1) - Djeddah (1996)
 King George VI Chase - (5) - Nupsala (1987), The Fellow (1991, 1992), Algan (1994), First Gold (2000)
 Long Walk Hurdle - (4) - Baracouda (2000, 2001, 2003, 2004)
 Sun Chariot Stakes - (1) - Siyouma (2012)
 Triumph Hurdle - (1) - Snow Drop (2000)
 World Hurdle - (2) - Baracouda (2002, 2003)

 Hong Kong
 Hong Kong Bowl - (1) - Jim and Tonic (1998)
 Hong Kong Cup - (1) - Jim and Tonic (1999)
 Queen Elizabeth II Cup - (1) - Jim and Tonic (1999)

 Ireland
 Punchestown Gold Cup - (1) - First Gold (2003)

 United Arab Emirates
 Dubai Duty Free - (1) - Jim and Tonic (2001)

 United States
 Hialeah Turf Cup Handicap - (1) - Double Bed (1988)

References

External links
 bbc.co.uk – François Doumen profile.
 guardian.co.uk – "Bliss makes the Doumen gloom vanish".
 independent.co.uk – "Deep in a French forest Doumen's giants stir".
 ntra.com – François Doumen profile.
 telegraph.co.uk – "Doumens at the double".

Living people
1940 births
French horse trainers